Ivan Adžić (Serbian Cyrillic: Иван Аџић; born 21 June 1973) is a Serbian former professional footballer who played as a midfielder.

Career
Adžić came through the youth system of Red Star Belgrade, making his senior debut on 2 December 1989, aged 16. He came on as a substitute for Darko Pančev in the 3–1 league win against Spartak Subotica. In the first half of the 1991–92 season, Adžić played on loan for Borac Banja Luka, before returning to his parent club.

After finishing his playing career, Adžić served as assistant manager to Ratko Dostanić and Walter Zenga at Red Star Belgrade from 2004 to 2006. He also spent one season as manager of Montenegrin club Rudar Pljevlja.

Adžić also served as the director of football of Red Star Belgrade for two and a half years between 2009 and 2011.

Personal life
His son, Luka, is also a footballer.

Statistics

Honours
Red Star Belgrade
 Yugoslav First League: 1989–90, 1990–91, 1991–92
 First League of FR Yugoslavia: 1994–95
 Yugoslav Cup: 1989–90
 FR Yugoslavia Cup: 1992–93, 1994–95, 1995–96

References

External links
 
 

Association football midfielders
Austrian Football Bundesliga players
CD Logroñés footballers
CD Toledo players
Expatriate footballers in Austria
Expatriate footballers in Spain
First League of Serbia and Montenegro players
FK Borac Banja Luka players
FK Borac Čačak players
FK Rudar Pljevlja managers
Footballers from Belgrade
La Liga players
Red Star Belgrade footballers
Red Star Belgrade non-playing staff
Segunda División players
Serbia and Montenegro expatriate footballers
Serbia and Montenegro expatriate sportspeople in Austria
Serbia and Montenegro expatriate sportspeople in Spain
Serbia and Montenegro footballers
Serbian football managers
Serbian footballers
SK Rapid Wien players
1973 births
Living people